William Morris (October 31, 1786 – June 29, 1858) was a businessman and political figure in Upper Canada.

He was born in Paisley, Scotland in 1786, the son of a Scottish manufacturer. His family came to Upper Canada in 1801, where his father set up an import-export business. The business failed and his father retired to a farm near Elizabethtown (Brockville). After the death of his father, he opened a general store with his brother, Alexander. He joined the militia during the War of 1812.

In 1816, he opened a second store in the new settlement at Perth. In 1818, he was appointed justice of the peace in the area and, in 1820, he was elected to the 8th Parliament of Upper Canada representing Carleton. He represented Carleton and then Lanark until 1836, when he was appointed to the Legislative Council. He also served as lieutenant-colonel in the local militia. He was involved in setting up the first canal connecting the Tay River to Lower Rideau Lake in 1834.

Although conservative, he was not part of the elite Family Compact, due in part to his strong affiliation with the Church of Scotland. His efforts to have the church recognized as one of the two national churches in the British Empire resulted in the creation of the Synod of the Presbyterian Church of Canada. He also played a major role in establishing Queen's College, later Queen's University and was the first chairman of the board of trustees. He was appointed to the Legislative Council when Upper and Lower Canada were united in 1841. In 1842, he was appointed warden for the Johnstown District. In 1844, he became receiver general for the United Canadas. In 1846, he became president of the Executive Council.

He suffered a stroke in 1853, at which point, he retired from active public life; he died at Montreal in 1858.

He was the brother of James Morris (Canada West politician).

See also 
 John Barclay
 William Bell

External links 
Biography at the Dictionary of Canadian Biography Online

1786 births
1858 deaths
Members of the Legislative Assembly of Upper Canada
Members of the Legislative Council of Upper Canada
Members of the Legislative Council of the Province of Canada
People from Leeds and Grenville United Counties
Scottish emigrants to pre-Confederation Ontario
Politicians from Paisley, Renfrewshire
Immigrants to Upper Canada